Mohd Saiful Rusly (born 2 February 1978) is a Malaysian football player who played for PDRM FA in the Malaysia Premier League in the 2010 season. He rejoined that club after he was released in November 2009 by Malaysia Super League team Terengganu FA where he had been a first-team regular.

References

1978 births
Living people
Malaysian footballers
Association football defenders
Sportspeople from Kuala Lumpur
PDRM FA players